Emei railway station is a railway station in Suishan, Emeishan City, Leshan, Sichuan, China. It is cross-shaped, with the lower north–south platforms serving the Chengdu–Kunming railway and the upper east–west platforms serving the Chengdu–Mianyang–Leshan intercity railway.

History

Emei railway station was built with the Chengdu–Kunming railway and opened in 1965. The station was moved approximately 500m south to allow it to serve the Chengdu–Mianyang–Leshan intercity railway. It reopened in its new location on 26 April 2017.

References

Railway stations in Sichuan
Railway stations in China opened in 1965